Jonathan Henrich, better known as Jonny Chops (born February 12, 1986), is a rock musician from Havertown, Pennsylvania. He is best known for his role as the former drummer of Wednesday 13. He has also played in several other bands, including Anti-Product, Trashlight Vision, and a few local bands including, Divided Sky and Copper Mine.

References 

1986 births
Living people
American heavy metal drummers
Horror punk musicians
Musicians from Pennsylvania
21st-century American drummers